The Colombo South Waste Processing Facility (also referred to as the Karadiyana W2E Project or Karadiyana Power Station) is a municipal solid waste-fired thermal power station currently under construction at a  site in Karadiyana, Sri Lanka. Together with the KCHT Power Station, it is one of two projects that won the bid by the Urban Development Authority, from a pool of 121 bidders. Construction of the facility began on 23 August 2017 with a completion slated for mid-2019.

It will use  of waste, with the generated power sold to the state-owned Ceylon Electricity Board at a rate of  generated. The residual bottom ash from the process will be used for road construction and other uses, while the unusable fly ash (amounting to 2%) will be disposed of at predesignated locations.

See also 
 List of power stations in Sri Lanka
 Muthurajawela wetlands

References

External links 
 
 
 
 

Fossil fuel power stations in Sri Lanka